Aaron Carpenter may refer to:

 Aaron Carpenter (rugby union) (born 1983), Canadian rugby player
 Aaron Carpenter (artist) (born 1975), Canadian visual artist